Peter Freeman (19 October 1888 – 19 May 1956) was a British Labour Party politician, tennis champion, animal rights activist, theosophist and vegetarian.

Biography

Freeman was born on 19 October 1888 in London, one of nine children of George James Freeman who was in the tobacco industry.

He was educated at the Haberdashers' School before entering the family business and he became managing directory of the Freeman factory in Cardiff, Wales. He was a noted lawn tennis player and won the Welsh Championship in 1919 and was also described as an expert swimmer.

He was elected as Member of Parliament (MP) for Brecon and Radnorshire at the 1929 general election, defeating the Conservative MP Walter D'Arcy Hall by only 187 votes. When Labour split at the 1931 general election over Ramsay MacDonald's formation of a National Government, D'Arcy Hall retook the seat with a majority of over 8,000.

Freeman unsuccessfully stood at the 1935 general election in the Newport constituency, losing by 1,545 votes to the Conservative MP Reginald Clarry. When Clarry died in January 1945, Freeman did not contest the by-election on 17 May. However, at the general election in July 1945, he took the seat with a majority of 9,091 votes over Clarry's Conservative successor Ronald McMillan Bell. He withdrew from his company responsibilities to devote himself to "Parliamentary, philanthropic and social obligations".

Freeman held the seat until his death in 1956 at the age of 67. The resulting 1956 Newport by-election was won by the Labour candidate Frank Soskice, the former Attorney General.

Freeman had married Ella Drummond Torrance and they had a son and daughter.

Personal life

Theosophy

Freeman was the general secretary of the Theosophical Society in Wales from 1922 to 1944. In 1924, he authored a pamphlet Druids and Theosophy.

Freeman contributed the chapter "The Practical Application of Theosophy to Politics and Government" to D. D. Kanga's book Where Theosophy and Science Meet.

Vegetarianism
Although his wealth came from the tobacco industry he was a non-smoker and vegetarian. Freeman was president of the Vegetarian Society between 1937 and 1942.

Freeman supported animal rights and colonial freedom. He was an anti-vivisection campaigner.

Selected publications

Druids and Theosophy (1924)
Our Younger Brothers: The Animals (1926)
A Vegetarian Looks at the World (The Theosophist, 1951)
The World Food Crisis Solved by a Vegetarian (1956)

References

Bibliography

External links 
 

1888 births
1956 deaths
Anti-vivisectionists
British vegetarianism activists
English animal rights activists
English male tennis players
English Theosophists
People associated with the Vegetarian Society
People educated at Haberdashers' Boys' School
Politics of Newport, Wales
Tennis people from Greater London
UK MPs 1929–1931
UK MPs 1945–1950
UK MPs 1950–1951
UK MPs 1951–1955
UK MPs 1955–1959
Welsh Labour Party MPs